Stenolicmus sarmientoi is a species of catfish native to Bolivia where it is found in the upper Apere River basin.  This species grows to a length of  NG.

References

Trichomycteridae
Fish of Bolivia
Fish described in 1990